Pumpyansky (Пумпянский) or Pumpyanskaya is a Russian surname. Notable people with the surname include:
 Aaron Elijah Pumpianski (1835–1893), Russian rabbi and author
 Dmitry Pumpyansky (born 1963/1964), Russian billionaire businessman
 Seda Pumpyanskaya, Russian journalist and publicist

Russian-language surnames